Redeyef is a town and commune in the Gafsa Governorate, Tunisia. As of 2004 it had a population of 26,143. City industry is mainly based on mining.

Infrastructure
Redeyef is Terminus of railway line Métlaoui-Redeyef. This line, used for transportation phosphates from mines, is famous because is runs through scenic selja gorges.

See also
List of cities in Tunisia

References

Communes of Tunisia
Populated places in Gafsa Governorate
Tunisia geography articles needing translation from French Wikipedia